Michael Stefanic (born February 24, 1996) is an American professional baseball infielder for the Los Angeles Angels of Major League Baseball (MLB). He made his MLB debut in 2022. He attended Westmont College and signed with the Angels as an undrafted free agent.

Amateur career
Stefanic attended Timberline High School in Boise, Idaho and played college baseball at Westmont College. During all four of his seasons with Westmont, he was selected to both the Golden State Athletic Conference's All-GSAC team and the GSAC Gold Glove team. In his sophomore, junior, and senior years, he led the team in batting average at .352, .371, and .392 respectively. In his senior season, he received an honorable mention for the National Association of Intercollegiate Athletics's All-American team as a second baseman. He graduated from Westmont in 2018 with a bachelor's degree in economics and business.

Professional career
After submitting for the 2018 Major League Baseball draft but going undrafted, Stefanic compiled a résumé and highlight compilation and sent it to 150–200 executives from all 30 MLB teams. Stefanic signed with the Los Angeles Angels as a free agent in July 2018 after being contacted by Angels coach Chris Mosch, who was seeking a replacement for an injured player on the Arizona Complex League Angels team. He spent his first professional season in the Arizona League and with the Orem Owlz, batting .351 over 14 games. Stefanic spent 2019 with the Burlington Bees and Inland Empire 66ers, batting .282 with three home runs and 47 runs batted in (RBI) over 102 games. He did not play a minor league game in 2020 because the season was cancelled due to the COVID-19 pandemic. He started 2021 with the Rocket City Trash Pandas before being promoted to the Salt Lake Bees. Over 125 games between the two teams, he batted .336 with 17 home runs, 63 RBIs, and 26 doubles.

On July 2, 2022, Stefanic was promoted to the majors for the first time, joining the Angels during their road series against the Houston Astros. He made his major league debut on July 3, 2022, batting sixth and playing second base against the Houston Astros at Minute Maid Park. He recorded his first major league hit on July 5, a pinch-hit single in the 9th inning off of Miami Marlins pitcher Tanner Scott at loanDepot Park. He subsequently scored his first major league run on a sacrifice fly from Taylor Ward. Through his first seven games, Stefanic batted .389 with an on-base percentage of .500, causing Angels manager Phil Nevin to promote him to the leadoff spot in the lineup on July 12. On July 28, Stefanic was optioned to Salt Lake. On September 14, he was recalled to the Angels.

Stefanic was optioned to the Triple-A Salt Lake Bees to start the 2023 season.

References

External links

1996 births
Living people
Sportspeople from Boise, Idaho
Baseball players from Idaho
Major League Baseball infielders
Los Angeles Angels players
Westmont Warriors baseball players
Arizona League Angels players
Orem Owlz players
Inland Empire 66ers of San Bernardino players
Burlington Bees players
Rocket City Trash Pandas players
Salt Lake Bees players
Anchorage Bucs players